Peter Jan Schoomaker (born February 12, 1946) is a retired four-star general of the United States Army who served as the 35th Chief of Staff of the United States Army from  August 1, 2003, to April 10, 2007. Schoomaker's appointment as Chief of Staff was unusual in that he was recalled and came out from retirement to assume the position. Schoomaker voluntarily retired from the Army for the second time in 2007 after completing the full four-year term as Chief of Staff.

Prior to his last assignment, Schoomaker spent over 30 years in a variety of assignments with both conventional and special operations forces – he was the first Special Forces-trained Army Chief of Staff and the second to serve on the Joint Chiefs of Staff (General Henry H. Shelton was the first, when he served as Chairman).

His brother, Lieutenant General Eric Schoomaker, was the 42nd Surgeon General of the United States Army.

Early life and education
Schoomaker was born on February 12, 1946, in Detroit, Michigan. He was raised in an army family. After attending East Lansing High School, Schoomaker graduated from the University of Wyoming in 1969 with a Bachelor of Science degree in education administration. A football player, he was a starter on Wyoming's Sugar Bowl team. He holds a Master of Arts degree in management from Central Michigan University, and an Honorary Doctorate of Laws from Hampden–Sydney College. Schoomaker attended the United States Army Command and General Staff College from August 1981 to June 1982 and the National War College from August 1988 to June 1989.

Military career
Schoomaker participated in numerous deployment operations including Eagle Claw in Iran, Urgent Fury in Grenada, Just Cause in Panama, Operation Desert Shield/Desert Storm in Southwest Asia, Uphold Democracy in Haiti, and supported various other operations.

After being commissioned as a second lieutenant after participating in the Reserve Officers' Training Corps program at the University of Wyoming, Schoomaker went to the United States Army Armor School at Fort Knox. He soon became a Reconnaissance Platoon Leader and Rifle Company Commander with 2nd Battalion, 4th Infantry, and a Cavalry Troop Commander with 1st Squadron, 2nd Armored Cavalry Regiment in Germany. He then served in Korea as the S-3 of 1st Battalion, 73rd Cavalry, 2nd Infantry Division. From 1978 to 1981, he commanded a squadron of the 1st Special Forces Operational Detachment – Delta (1st SFOD-D), commonly known to the public as "Delta Force", at Fort Bragg, North Carolina. Following a year at the army's Command and General Staff College at Fort Leavenworth, Kansas, Schoomaker served as the Squadron Executive Officer, 2nd Squadron, 2nd Armored Cavalry Regiment in Germany. In August 1983, he returned to Fort Bragg, to serve as Special Operations Officer, J-3, Joint Special Operations Command. From August 1985 to August 1988, Schoomaker commanded another squadron of the 1st SFOD-D. Following the National War College in Washington, D.C., he returned to command Delta Force from June 1989 to July 1992. Subsequently, 
Schoomaker served as the Assistant Division Commander of the 1st Cavalry Division, Fort Hood, Texas, followed by a tour in the Headquarters, Department of the Army staff as the Deputy Director for Operations, Readiness and Mobilization.

Schoomaker served as the Commanding General of the Joint Special Operations Command from July 1994 to August 1996, followed by command of the United States Army Special Operations Command at Fort Bragg, North Carolina through October 1997. His most recent assignment prior to assuming duties as the Army Chief of Staff was as Commander, United States Special Operations Command at MacDill Air Force Base, Florida, from November 1997 to November 2000, after which he retired from the Army. According to the 9/11 Commission, Schoomaker wanted to take action against Al Qaeda in Afghanistan using his special operators but was unable to gain approval for the mission.

In 2003 Schoomaker returned to active duty to serve as Chief of Staff of the United States Army, at the request of Secretary of Defense Donald Rumsfeld.  Schoomaker retired at the end of his tour of duty as Chief of Staff in 2007.

Post-military career
After his retirement from active duty, Schoomaker served as a Director for DynCorp, as well as on the advisory boards of Camber Corporation and EWA-Government Systems Inc. Concurrently, Schoomaker was the Director of CAE USA Inc. from November 2007 to February 2009, where he still serves a member of the Human Resources Committee as well as an independent director and consultant on defense matters. Schoomaker is also currently a Director of Aeroflex Incorporated and several private and non-profit companies, including the Special Operations Warrior Foundation. In 2018, Peter Schoomaker joined MAG Aerospace's board of directors.

Dates of rank

Decorations and badges

See also
 Project Manager Battle Command

References

Sources

External links

  An assessment of Army preparedness in terms of manpower, equipment, and funding.  Delivered before the House Committee on the Armed Services.
 

1946 births
Living people
People from Ingham County, Michigan
American people of Dutch descent
People from East Lansing, Michigan
Wyoming Cowboys football players
University of Wyoming alumni
Military personnel from Michigan
United States Army Rangers
Members of the United States Army Special Forces
Central Michigan University alumni
United States Army Command and General Staff College alumni
National War College alumni
Recipients of the Meritorious Service Medal (United States)
Recipients of the Legion of Merit
United States Army generals
Delta Force
Joint Chiefs of Staff
United States Army Chiefs of Staff
Recipients of the Defense Superior Service Medal
Recipients of the Distinguished Service Medal (US Army)
Recipients of the Defense Distinguished Service Medal
Recipients of the Humanitarian Service Medal